The Musée Verger-Tarin is a museum in Autun, France.

History 
In 1475, Cardinal Rolin built a building between two pre-existing walls to house altar boys and their masters. The place will later be occupied by sub-chanters, and the street will take its name from it in 1791. In 1791, the building belonged to a certain Jossier, then passed from hand to hand. During the Restoration, the local commander of the National Guard, Chevalier Pasquier, acquired it. In 1845, Louise-Philiberte Verger-Tarin, widow for five years of Pierre Verger and niece of the Chevalier Pasquier, inherited the residence. She had three children including a daughter who left the premises at her wedding. The two boys (Victor and Henri) lived with their mother until her death and became co-owners of the building. They did not marry. Victor was honorably appreciated, and was a steward by profession over a hundred estates.

In 1913, on Victor's death, the hotel passed to his eldest niece Marie Bachelet, who left no posterity. On May 8, 1933, anxious to guarantee her old age and careful not to disperse the contents of her house, she sold her property, wall and furniture to the Société Eduenne before a notary, reserving the right to live there. She died in 1939, and the Eduenne Society turned it into a museum.

In 1954, the city became the owner. The museum is abandoned and serves as a deposit. In 1980, a meticulous reorganization was carried out. In 2001 and 2002, it was the setting for guided tours and night tours with a local theater company named Arc-en-Scène. Since then, the place has suffered serious damage (collapse of the kitchen ceiling). In 2011, the museum is still not open to visitors.

Sources 

 Denis Grivot, Autun, Lescuyer, Lyon 1967, p.319
 Jean Berthollet, Catalogue du Musée Verger-Tarin d'Autun, Dejussieu, Autun, 1947
 Harold de Fontenay, Autun et ses monuments, Dejussieu, Autun, 1899, p.407

See also 
List of museums in France

Museums in Saône-et-Loire
Defunct museums in France